Pommez Internacional is an Argentine band, founded in 2010 in Buenos Aires

Discography

Albums
Canto Serpiente (LP, 2016)
Buenas Noches America (LP, 2013)
La carrera del animal ["Animal's Run"] (OST, 2011)
Contraluz Contraataque (LP, 2010)

Singles
"Imperio" (2015) 
"Rosario de la Frontera/La Celebracion" (2011)

References

External links
 Enlace externo a modo de ejemplo

Musical groups established in 2010
Argentine musical groups
2010 establishments in Argentina